The 1993 Tennents' Sixes was the tenth and final staging of the indoor 6-a-side football tournament. It was held at the Scottish Exhibition and Conference Centre (SECC) in Glasgow on 24 and 25 January.

Clubs from the 1992-93 Premier Division season competed except Rangers and Dundee and the two group winners and runners-up qualified to the semi-finals and Partick Thistle became the final Sixes winners beating Airdrieonians 4–3.

Group 1

Group 2

Semi-finals

Final

References

External links
Scottish Football Historical Archive
Tennent’s Sixes 1993: Video highlights, part one  at STV
Tennent's Sixes 1993: Video highlights, part two  at STV

1992–93 in Scottish football
Tennents' Sixes
January 1993 sports events in the United Kingdom
1990s in Glasgow
Sports competitions in Glasgow
Football in Glasgow